William Vincent McBride (May 25, 1922 – August 26, 2022) was a general in the United States Air Force who served as Vice Chief of Staff of the United States Air Force from 1975 to 1978.

Biography

Early life
McBride was born in Wampum, Pennsylvania, in 1922, the son of Ray and Iva McBride. He received his high school education from Wampum High School in 1939. He later attended Garfield Business Institute, Beaver Falls, Pennsylvania.

McBride enlisted in the United States Army Air Corps in 1942 and entered aviation cadet training. He completed navigation training at the Pan American Airways Navigation School, Coral Gables, Florida, and graduated as a second lieutenant. He next attended bombardier school in Carlsbad, New Mexico, and in March 1943 entered combat crew training as a navigator-bombardier in B-26 Marauder aircraft at MacDill Field, Florida.

Early career
In July 1943 he joined the 387th Bombardment Group in the European Theater of Operations as squadron navigator and later served as group navigator. He helped plan and flew on many of the important missions in support of the Allied ground forces offensive, including D-Day operations.

After World War II, he trained new navigators at Ellington Field, Texas, and then was assigned to Lackland Army Air Field, Texas, to help organize the present Air Force basic training base. He attended basic and advanced pilot training at Randolph Air Force Base, Texas, and Barksdale Air Force Base, Louisiana in 1947–1948 to become a triple-rated officer. In 1950 he attended New York University in New York City.

Since that time, many of his military assignments were in the Military Airlift Command in weather reconnaissance, air rescue and airlift functions.

During the Korean War, he commanded the Second Air Rescue Group in Okinawa and in the Philippines. After a tour of duty in Headquarters Air Rescue Service as deputy chief of staff for plans, he commanded the Eighth Air Rescue Group at Stead Air Force Base, Nevada, during 1956–1957. He then commanded the 1608th Air Transport Group at Charleston Air Force Base, South Carolina The group was responsible for providing airlift to Africa, the Middle East and Latin America.

In 1959, General McBride was assigned as a student to the National War College in Washington D.C., and in early 1960, as a member of a small official group of National War College students, visited Moscow and toured points of interest in the Soviet Union.

Later career
In July 1960, he was assigned to Headquarters United States Air Force, Directorate of Plans, to work on problems related to counterinsurgency and special warfare. He served first as assistant chief of the Cold War Division and later as chief of the Special Warfare Division.

In June 1964, he was selected by Secretary of the Air Force Eugene M. Zuckert to become his military assistant. When Secretary Harold Brown replaced Mr. Zuckert in October 1965, McBride remained as the military assistant where he was called on to advise and assist the secretary and undersecretary on operational, planning and programming matters.

McBride was assigned as commander of the 437th Military Airlift Wing, Charleston Air Force Base, South Carolina, in August 1966. McBride was assigned to Headquarters Military Airlift Command in March 1969 as deputy chief of staff, materiel; he became deputy chief of staff, operations, in September 1969; and chief of staff, Military Airlift Command, in March 1970.

McBride was assigned as vice commander in chief, United States Air Forces in Europe, with headquarters at Lindsey Air Station, Wiesbaden, Germany, in September 1971. He assumed command of Air Training Command in September 1972, and became commander of the Air Force Logistics Command in September 1974.

McBride was appointed Vice Chief of Staff of the United States Air Force on September 1, 1975. He was promoted to the grade of general effective September 1, 1974, with same date of rank. He retired on March 31, 1978.

McBride was married to Katherine Adeline Solsberg for 76 years before her death in 2021. He lived in San Antonio, Texas. He turned 100 on May 25, 2022, and died on August 26.

Awards
Awards earned over his career include:
Air Force Distinguished Service Medal with two oak leaf clusters
Legion of Merit with two oak leaf clusters
Distinguished Flying Cross
Air Medal with thirteen oak leaf clusters
Presidential Unit Citation emblem
Air Force Outstanding Unit Award ribbon with an oak leaf cluster
French Croix de Guerre with gold palm
Command pilot and navigator

Effective dates of promotion
Source:

References

External links
Photo of a plaque dedicated to William

1922 births
2022 deaths
American centenarians
Men centenarians
United States Air Force generals
Vice Chiefs of Staff of the United States Air Force
United States Army Air Forces personnel of World War II
United States Air Force personnel of the Korean War
United States Air Force personnel of the Vietnam War
Recipients of the Legion of Merit
Recipients of the Air Medal
Recipients of the Distinguished Flying Cross (United States)
Recipients of the Order of the Sword (United States)
People from Lawrence County, Pennsylvania
United States Army Air Forces officers
Military personnel from Pennsylvania